Tornioli is a surname. Notable people with the surname include:

Evangelista Tornioli (1570–1630), Italian Roman Catholic bishop 
Niccolò Tornioli, Italian painter